Keith Embray (born November 29, 1969) is a former American football defensive end. He played for the Las Vegas Posse in 1994, the Hamilton Tiger-Cats from 1995 to 1996 and for the Tennessee Titans in 2000.

References

1969 births
Living people
American football defensive ends
Utah Utes football players
Las Vegas Posse players
Hamilton Tiger-Cats players
Tennessee Titans players